Lithium carbide, often known as dilithium acetylide, is a chemical compound of lithium and carbon, an acetylide. It was first produced by Moissan, in 1896 who reacted coal with lithium carbonate. 

Li2CO3 + 4C->Li2C2 + 3CO   

The other lithium-rich compounds are produced by reacting lithium vapor with chlorinated hydrocarbons, e.g. CCl4. Lithium carbide is sometimes confused with the drug lithium carbonate, because of the similarity of its name.

Preparation and chemistry
In the laboratory samples may be prepared by treating acetylene with a solution of lithium in ammonia, on −40°C, with creation of addition compound of Li2C2 • C2H2 • 2NH3 that decomposes in stream of hydrogen at room temperature giving white powder of Li2C2.

C2H2 + 2Li -> Li2C2 + H2

Samples prepared in this manner generally are poorly crystalline. Crystalline samples may be prepared by a reaction between molten lithium and graphite at over 1000 °C. Li2C2 can also be prepared by reacting CO2 with molten lithium.

10Li + 2CO2 -> Li2C2 + 4Li2O    

Other method for production of Li2C2 is heating of metallic lithium in atmosphere of ethylene. 

6Li + C2H4 -> Li2C2 + 4LiH

Lithium carbide hydrolyzes readily to form acetylene:

Li2C2 + 2H2O -> 2LiOH + C2H2

Lithium hydride reacts with graphite at 400°C forming lithium carbide.

2LiH + 4C  ->  Li2C2 + C2H2

Also Li2C2 can be formed when organometallic compound n-Butyllithium reacts with ethyne in THF or Et2O used as a solvent, reaction is rapid and highly exothermic.

{C2H2} + 2BuLi ->[\ce{Et2O\ or\ THF}] {Li2C2} + 2C4H10

Lithium carbide reacts with acetylene in liquid ammonia rapidly to give a clear solution of lithium acetylide.

LiC≡CLi + HC≡CH → 2 LiC≡CH

Preparation of the reagent in this way sometimes improves the yield in an ethynylation over that obtained with reagent prepared from lithium and acetylene.

Structure
 is a Zintl phase compound and exists as a salt, . Its reactivity, combined with the difficulty in growing suitable single crystals, has made the determination of its crystal structure difficult. It adopts a distorted anti-fluorite crystal structure, similar to that of rubidium peroxide and caesium peroxide. Each Li atom is surrounded by six carbon atoms from 4 different acetylides, with two acetylides co-ordinating side -on and the other two end-on. The observed C-C distance of 120 pm indicates the presence of a C≡C triple bond.
At high temperatures  transforms reversibly to a cubic anti-fluorite structure.

Use in radiocarbon dating

There are a number of procedures employed, some that burn the sample producing CO2 that is then reacted  with lithium, and others where the carbon containing sample is reacted directly with lithium metal. The outcome is the same: Li2C2 is produced, which can then be used to create species easy to use in mass spectroscopy, like acetylene and benzene.  Note that lithium nitride may be formed and this produces ammonia when hydrolyzed, which contaminates the acetylene gas.

References

Lithium compounds
Acetylides
Carbides